Koduvazhannoor  is a village in Thiruvananthapuram district in the state of Kerala, India.

Demographics
 India census, Koduvazhannoor had a population of 8411 with 3969 males and 4442 females.

References

Villages in Thiruvananthapuram district